Lutalo Muhammad (born 3 June 1991) is a British taekwondo athlete who represented Great Britain at the 2012 Summer Olympics, winning a bronze medal, and the 2016 Summer Olympics, winning a silver medal. He won the gold medal in the −87 kg class at the 2012 European Taekwondo Championships. He is the most successful male in British taekwondo history.

Early life
Muhammad was born on 3 June 1991 in Walthamstow, London, England. He was coached by his father, Wayne Muhammad, in the art of taekwondo from the age of three.

2012 Summer Olympics
Muhammad won the gold medal in the −87 kg class at the 2012 European Taekwondo Championships.

There is no −87 kg category in the Olympic Games; however, Muhammad was selected to be Britain's representative in the −80 kg category at the 2012 Summer Olympics. This decision was controversial as he was selected instead of Aaron Cook, who was the World No. 1 and European champion in the −80 kg class. The controversy attracted considerable attention in the media.

The decision drew criticism from former athletes such as John Cullen and Steve Redgrave. Muhammed received hate mail following his selection. GB performance director Gary Hall defended his selection and said "Aaron has a bigger marketing machine than the whole of GB Taekwondo", whilst fellow taekwondo competitor Sarah Stevenson dismissed the world rankings as inconsequential.

Muhammad stated that "Unfortunately with the nature of sport there are always going to be winners and losers so I wish him all the best for his future, but my focus right now is not Aaron Cook, it's a gold medal in London." In the Games, Muhammad reached the quarter-finals where he lost to Nicolás García of Spain. In the repechage, he defeated Armenian Arman Yeremyan 9–3 winning a bronze medal.

2016 Summer Olympics 
Muhammad won the Olympic silver medal −80 kg category improving on his bronze from 2012. Muhammad was leading 6–4 in the final before losing in the last second to Cheick Sallah Cisse of Ivory Coast. Down by two points and only one second remaining, Cisse released a spinning hook kick that landed on Muhammad's head, scoring 4 points and winning the bout.

Honours
2008 German Open (Gold) Jnr
GLL Sports Foundation Award (2008)
Middlesex University Sportsman of the Year (2011)
2012 London Olympics (Bronze)
2012 European Championships (Gold)
Middlesex University Sportsman of the Year (2012)
2013 National Championships (Gold)
2013 World Grand Prix Final (Gold)
2014 European Championships (Bronze)
2014 National Championships (Gold)
2014 Commonwealth Championships (Gold)
2015 European Club Championships (Gold)
2015 European Olympic Games (Bronze)
2015 World Grand Prix Final (Gold)
2016 Rio de Janeiro Olympics (Silver)

References

1991 births
Living people
English male taekwondo practitioners
Olympic taekwondo practitioners of Great Britain
Black British sportspeople
Taekwondo practitioners at the 2012 Summer Olympics
Taekwondo practitioners at the 2016 Summer Olympics
Alumni of Middlesex University
Sportspeople from Manchester
People from Walthamstow
Olympic silver medallists for Great Britain
Olympic bronze medallists for Great Britain
Olympic medalists in taekwondo
Medalists at the 2012 Summer Olympics
Medalists at the 2016 Summer Olympics
Taekwondo practitioners at the 2015 European Games
European Games medalists in taekwondo
European Games bronze medalists for Great Britain
English people of Zimbabwean descent
European Taekwondo Championships medalists